Barry George Pascoe (23 January 1944 – 23 June 2007) was an Australian rules footballer who played with North Melbourne and St Kilda in the Victorian Football League (VFL).

Pascoe started his career at North Adelaide in the SANFL, amassing 25 games as a ruck-rover. He spent 12 months on the sidelines in 1966 in order to be cleared to join his brother Bob at North Melbourne.

After just one season, he crossed to St Kilda to again play beside his brother, who had left following a pay dispute. He had a good first season in 1968, playing 20 games and finishing as the club's fourth best vote getter in the Brownlow Medal count.   Despite being used as a ruck-over he became known for his ability to find goals and the following season kicked 13 goals for the second successive year. A cruciate ligament injury to his knee ended his career in 1970.

References

1944 births
North Adelaide Football Club players
North Melbourne Football Club players
St Kilda Football Club players
Australian rules footballers from South Australia
2007 deaths